Dürr AG is a global mechanical and plant engineering firm. The company, founded by Paul Dürr (1871–1936) as a metal shop for roof flashing in Bad Cannstatt in 1895, has been listed on the Frankfurt Stock Exchange since 4 January 1990. Meanwhile, the shares are listed in the MDAX and Stoxx 600. The customers of Dürr AG include almost all familiar automobile manufacturers and their suppliers. Other market segments include, for example, the mechanical engineering, chemical and pharmaceutical industries and – since the takeover of HOMAG Group AG in October 2014 – the woodworking industry. The company is registered in Stuttgart, but its actual location (mailing address) has been in Bietigheim-Bissingen since 1 August 2009 after the relocation of various business units.

Company history  
In 1896, a metal shop for roof flashing was founded in Bad Cannstatt by Paul Dürr. In 1917, the company expanded to sheet metal processing. In 1932, Paul Dürr handed the running of the company over to his son, Otto Dürr, who established a construction office.

Plant construction began in 1950 with the first system for chemical surface treatment. In 1963, Dürr installed the first equipment for electrophoretic dip-painting in the Ford factory in Genk, Belgium. In 1964 and 1966, subsidiaries were founded in Brazil and Mexico.

In 1978, Dürr expanded into the fields of automation and conveyor systems. Dürr launches its IPO and takes over the Behr-Group. So that all core capabilities for paint shop construction are now combined within one company. Dürr took over the French competitor Alstom Automation in 1999. The measuring systems group Carl Schenck AG also became part of the Dürr Group in 2000. In 2003, Dürr acquired the largest order in the company's history: General Motors ordered three paint shops in North America. In the summer of 2009, Dürr relocated its headquarter to the Bietigheim-Bissingen location.

In 2011 Dürr is expanding activities in the energy efficiency business area. In addition to exhaust air purification systems, that includes processes for utilizing energy recovered from industrial waste heat.

After 23 years at the top of the supervisory board of Dürr AG, Heinz Dürr retired from office in April 2013. Klaus Eberhardt was elected as his successor by the supervisory board, having been a member of the control body since 2012.

2014 Dürr acquires the majority of HOMAG Group AG, the world market leader for woodworking machines.

Dürr is represented in 32 countries at 123 business locations.

Shareholder structure  

Last change: 04/21/2022

Divisions  
 Paint and Final Assembly Systems: paint shops and final assembly systems for the automotive industry
 Application Technology: robot technologies for the automatic application of paint as well as sealants and adhesives 
 Measuring and Process Systems: balancing and cleaning systems as well as testing and filling technology
 Clean Technology Systems: exhaust-air purification systems and energy-efficiency technology
 Woodworking Machinery and Systems: machinery for the woodworking industry

References

External links
Dürr AG official website
Dürr Group official website

Auto parts suppliers of Germany
Engineering companies of Germany
Manufacturing companies based in Stuttgart
Manufacturing companies established in 1883
Companies in the MDAX